The 1977–78 season was Stoke City's 71st season in the Football League and the 24th in the Second Division.

With Stoke back in the Second Division for the first time since 1963 morale around the area was low and was not helped by a poor start to the season away at Mansfield Town. George Eastham was sacked in January 1978 and Alan A'Court took over as caretaker manager. A'Court was in charge of just one match, which was one of the most infamous in the club's history, a 3–2 defeat at home to non-league Blyth Spartans in the FA Cup. Alan Durban was appointed manager and his new signings brought life back into the squad and guided Stoke to a respectable 7th position.

Season review

League
With Mr T.Degg now Chairman and the club in the Second Division, with little or no money at his disposal and rumblings that Peter Shilton wanted to leave the picture was far from rosy. George Eastham, who was now given the managers job on a permanent basis sold veteran John Mahoney to Middlesbrough for £130,000. Into the club came experienced midfielder Howard Kendall from Birmingham City for £165,000, full-back Alec Lindsay from Liverpool, Paul Richardson from Chester City and David Gregory from Peterborough United. These new arrivals would go on to have mixed success at Stoke.

Stoke's first match in the Second Division for 14 years was against Third Division champions Mansfield Town on 20 August 1977. They lost 2–1 at Field Mill where the fans let the club down badly, as after the match there was a riot. The disenchantment was patently obvious and it was no surprise when Shilton moved on to Nottingham Forest for £240,000. Eastham was starting to become a worried man and with goalscoring still a major problem he brought in Viv Busby for £50,000 but he also failed to impress. It was becoming obvious that Eastham could not make it as a manager and he was sacked in early January. Alan A'Court took over as caretaker manager and in his only match in charge, Stoke lost to Blyth Spartans.

The Stoke board decided to appoint Shrewsbury Town's Alan Durban as the club's new manager. Durban, an ex-Wales international, had made over 600 appearances in the Football League and he immediately introduced some much needed discipline into the club. His first signing was Brendan O'Callaghan, brought from Doncaster Rovers for £40,000. O'Callaghan made a dream start to his Stoke career coming on as a substitute in the home match against Hull City, and he scored from a corner with his first touch. Goalkeeper Peter Fox also arrived as Stoke ended the season in decent enough form finishing in 7th place which was respectable considering at one stage they were lying in 18th. However it was a strange season as despite finishing in 7th Stoke were only five points away from relegation.

FA Cup
After easily defeating non-league Tilbury 4–0 in the third round Stoke were drawn again at home to non-league opponents, Blyth Spartans. Stoke struggled to cope with the part-timers on a terrible pitch and with the match seemingly heading for a replay, Terry Johnson scored the winning goal for Blyth to complete an FA Cup giant-killing.

League Cup
Bristol City's Kevin Mabbutt scored the only goal as Stoke exited this season's League Cup at the first stage.

Final league table

Results

Stoke's score comes first

Legend

Football League Second Division

FA Cup

League Cup

Friendlies

Squad statistics

References

Stoke City F.C. seasons
Stoke